Vienna – Berlin is a 1926 Austrian-German silent film directed by Hans Steinhoff and starring Charlotte Ander, Anita Dorris and Egon von Jordan. It was shot at the Terra Studios in Berlin. The film's art director was Hans Jacoby. It premiered at Berlin's Gloria-Palast.

Cast
Charlotte Ander as Grollmann's daughter Karla  
Anita Dorris as Lonerl  
Egon von Jordan as Rudi  
Fritz Spira as Berndörfer  
Bruno Kastner as Grollmann's son Joachim  
Fritz Alberti as Grollmann 
Jenny Marba as Berndörfer's wife
Wilhelm Diegelmann as Diener bei Berndörfer  
Jaro Fürth as Accountant Huber 
Kurt Gerron as American 
Paul Morgan as a stockbroker  
Franz Groß as Arbeiter Wallner 
Henry Bender as The Fat Lord  
Teddy Bill as Ein Heurigenfänger

References

External links

Austrian silent feature films
Films directed by Hans Steinhoff
Terra Film films
Austrian black-and-white films
Films shot at Terra Studios
German black-and-white films
Films of the Weimar Republic
German silent feature films